This is a timeline of the presence of Eastern Orthodoxy in Greece from 2008. The history of Greece traditionally encompasses the study of the Greek people, the areas they ruled historically, as well as the territory now composing the modern state of Greece.

Third Hellenic Republic (from 2008) 

2008 Abp. Ieronymos II (Liapis) of Athens elected; Glorification of George (Karslidis) of Drama; Pan-Orthodox meeting in Constantinople in October of the Primates of the fourteen Eastern Orthodox Churches, signing a document calling for inter-orthodox unity and collaboration and "the continuation of preparations for the Holy and Great Council"; the 13-member standing committee of the Church of Greece denounced government plans to introduce a civil partnerships law, saying government support for common law marriage would amount to state-sanctioned "prostitution;" Ecumenical Patriarch Bartholomew Addresses European Parliament; the relics of Saint Peter of Argos are returned to Argos, Greece, from a monastery chapel in Rome belonging to a Spanish order of monks; the Arab-Hellenic Center for Culture and Civilization (AHCCC) was established in Athens, financed with a donation of around US$3.4 million by 'Europe Trust', a UK-based fund closely related with the Muslim Brotherhood's umbrella organization 'Federation of Islamic Organizations in Europe (FIOE)'.
2008–2014 According to a Bank of Greece report, over 427,000 people (ages 15 to 64) left Greece since 2008, marking the third wave of mass emigration in the 20th and 21st centuries.
2009 In the aftermath of the global Financial crisis of 2007–2008, the Greek government-debt crisis began in late 2009, also known as the Greek Depression, with a series of sudden reforms and austerity measures leading to impoverishment and loss of income and property of the Greek populace, as well as a small-scale humanitarian crisis; led by three senior Archbishops, a group of Orthodox clergy in Greece published the manifesto, A Confession of Faith Against Ecumenism,  pledging to resist all ecumenical ties with Roman Catholics and Protestants, amongst its signatories including six metropolitans, 49 archimandrites, 22 hieromonks, 30 nuns and abbesses, and many other priests and church elders; Orthodox-Roman Catholic Joint Commission meets in Paphos, Cyprus, 11th plenary, studying the theme "The Role of the Bishop of Rome in the Communion of the Church in the First Millennium;" US President Barack Obama made an explicit appeal in his speech to the Turkish Parliament for the reopening of the hotly contested Greek Orthodox Theological Seminary on Halki; Russian Orthodox Patr. Kirill of Moscow called on Turkish authorities to re-open the Theological Seminary on Halki; repose of Elder Joseph of Vatopedi a noted twentieth century monastic regarded as one of the few remaining true Athonite elders; the first complete German-language translation of the Septuagint was published by the German Bible Society under the title "Septuaginta Deutsch", founded on the Göttingen Septuagint edition, and the Rahlfs edition for the books not yet contained in that version; the European Court of Human Rights (ECHR) ruled that Turkey violated the property rights of the Bozcaada Kimisis Teodoku Greek Orthodox Church on the Aegean island of Bozcaada; Patr. Mor Ignatius Zakka I Iwas of the Oriental Church of Antioch went on an official visit to Greece, to renew the relationship between both churches; Greek Orthodox Church urges Christians across Europe to unite in an appeal against a ban on crucifixes in classrooms in Italy; Viktor Yanukovych makes pilgrimage to Mount Athos; over 1,000 Muslims rallied in Athens over unsubstantiated claims that Greek police allegedly tore up and trampled on the Quran.
2010 The Metropolis of Attica was split into 2 new Metropolises: the Metropolis of Kifissia, Amaroussion and Oropos, and the Metropolis of Ilion, Acharnes and Petroupolis; on Sunday, 15 August, 2010 Ecumenical Patriarch Bartholomew I conducted the first Divine Liturgy in 88 years at the historic monastery of Panagia Soumela in Trapezounta, northeastern Turkey, marking the first official religious service carried out at the ancient monastery since the foundation of the modern Turkish Republic; death of Metr. Augoustinos Kantiotes of Florina, a prolific spiritual writer and defender of traditional Orthodox theology. death of painter, illustrator, engraver and writer Rallis Kopsidis (1929–2010), a student of Photis Kontoglou who was inspired by the Macedonian (11th–14th c.) and Cretan (14th–17th c.) Schools, who took part in painting the frescoes of the Byzantine Church of Chevetogne Abbey in Belgium (1955–57) as well as the church of the Orthodox Centre of the Ecumenical Patriarchate in Chambesy, Geneva, considered one of the pioneers of his generation even though his work is not particularly well known; Croatian Roman Catholic Archdiocese of Zadar gives cherished relic of St. Simeon to the Greek Orthodox Patriarchate of Jerusalem. 

2011 The Governments of Armenia, Bulgaria, Cyprus, the Russian Federation, Greece, Lithuania, Malta, and the Republic of San Marino filed a joint submission as a third-party intervener in the case of  Lautsi v. Italy  (Application no. 30814/06) in the European Court of Human Rights (ECHR), arguing that the cross was a symbol deeply ingrained in their respective heritages and that to extend the values of a secular State to the whole of Europe would represent the "Americanisation" of Europe in that a single and unique rule and a rigid separation of Church and State would be binding on everyone, with the Grand Chamber of the European Court of Human Rights (ECHR) ruling on 18 March 2011, by a majority (15 votes to two) that there was no violation of Article 2 of Protocol No. 1 (the right to education) and no separate issue under Article 9 (the rights of freedom of thought, conscience, and religion) to the European Convention on Human Rights, thus upholding the display in public places of religious and cultural symbols and affirming freedom of religion; on Sunday 3 April 2011, at 9:30pm, in the Church of the Holy Trinity in Kalymnos, the face of Christ crowned with thorns appeared in the icon of the Virgin Mary on the iconostasis; canonization of 1241 New Martyrs of Naoussa, Greece, massacred by the Ottomans from Thursday of Bright Week to the Sunday of Thomas in 1822. Metropolitan Hilarion (Alfeyev) of Volokolamsk, chairman of the Department of External Church Relations of the Russian Orthodox Church (DECR), visits the Greek Orthodox Church; launch of "The Great Orthodox Christian Encyclopedia" 12-Volume set, blessed and sponsored by Ecumenical Patriarch Bartholomew I of Constantinople, Patriarch Theodore II of Alexandria, Patriarch Ignatius IV of Antioch, Patriarch Theophilos III of Jerusalem, Archbishop Chrysostomos II of Cyprus, Archbishop Ieronymos II of Athens and All Greece, and others; Chief Rabbi Yona Metzger signed a historic declaration on 6 December 2011, in Nicosia, Cyprus, with Archbishop Chrysostomos, primate of the Church of Cyprus, in which both of them promised to deepen relations between the Church and the Jewish people; Greek Orthodox Church officials wrote a letter to the president of the European Commission, José Barroso protesting the hardships the Greek people were being made to suffer; a December 2011 nationwide survey conducted by Metron Analysis (one of the biggest independent market research and public opinion survey companies in Greece), 95% of those polled reported that they were Orthodox Christians, while 1.5% said that they belong to some other religion, and 2.8% of the population said that they were irreligious or atheist, which is among the lowest figures in Europe.
2012 Ecumenical Patriarch Bartholomew gave a landmark address at the Turkish Parliament's Constitution Conciliation Commission, tasked with drafting a new constitution for Turkey, presenting an 18-page report demanding equal treatment and rights for Turkey's non-Muslim communities, including state-aid for churches and minority schools; the Greek Orthodox Church of Albania rejected an official census in the Balkan country suggesting that ethnic Greeks represent just 6.75 percent of the overall population, with the Church instead claiming that the figure is at 24 percent, slightly above that of previous censuses that put the percentage at 20.7 percent in 1942 and 22.3 percent in 1927; in June the Church of Cyprus gave a part of the holy relics of St. Lazarus to a delegation of the Russian Orthodox Church led by Patriarch Kirill of Moscow and All Russia; in October, Abp. Ieronymos spoke out against Europe's handling of the financial crisis in Greece which, he said, is encroaching on the debt-hit nation's sovereignty; in November Metr. Seraphim (Mentzelopoulos) of Piraeus filed a blasphemy complaint against the director and actors of the theatrical play "Corpus Christi," which portrayed Jesus and the Apostles as gay men; in 2012 deaths in Greece outnumbered births by 16,300, while 44,200 more people left the country than moved to it; the number of employed people was 3.8 million compared to 4.1 million pensioners and the unemployed, out of a population of 11,062,500; commenting to the BBC on the issue of constructing a mosque in Athens, Metr. Seraphim (Mentzelopoulos) of Piraeus remarked that "Greece suffered five centuries of Islamic tyranny under Turkish rule and building a mosque would offend the martyrs who freed us," adding that "we are not a multicultural country."
2013 Plot to assassinate Ecumenical Patriarch Bartholomew uncovered by Turkish police; Ecumenical Patriarch Bartholomew opens seminar on religious freedom celebrating the 1700th anniversary of the Edict of Milan; the EU published guidelines to the promotion and protection of freedom of religion or belief (FoRB); Patriarch Kirill I of Moscow and all Rus’ made an official visit to Greece; Patr. Kirill I of Moscow visited Mount Athos, accompanied by Metr. Hilarion of Volokolamsk, head of the Department for External Church Relations (DECR), visiting several monasteries and hermitages, venerating their shrines and celebrating the Divine Liturgy at the Russian Monastery of St. Panteleimon; Metr. Seraphim (Mentzelopoulos) of Piraeus condemned the position of the Pope, and others, on 4 March 2013, in an encyclical on the Sunday of Orthodoxy, during which those who have abandoned Orthodoxy for heresy are traditionally condemned; in a letter in late March to Abp. Ieronymos of Athens and All-Greece, Patr. Bartholomew responded that he was especially concerned by the recent statement by Metr. Seraphim invoking an anathema against the pope, Protestants, Jews, Muslims and Ecumenists; on 27 June 2013, Metr. Seraphim (Mentzelopoulos) of Piraeus sent a 73-page epistle to Patr. Bartholomew about the subject of Ecumenism; the Greek Parliament passed a bill lifting the ban on Sunday shopping, liberalizing the country's trading laws as demanded by the Troika of international lenders in exchange for further bailout aid, protested by the Church of Greece and more than seventeen Greek trade unions; Church of Greece draws up a three-year financial plan in an effort to determine the size of its debt and to exploit its assets, according to Abp. Ieronymos II (Liapis) of Athens; the US House subcommittee for European affairs called the Turkish government to "facilitate the reopening of the Ecumenical Patriarchate's Theological School of Halki without condition or further delay"; on 27 November, the Sacred and Holy Synod of the Ecumenical Patriarchate formally glorified Elder Porphyrios (Bairaktaris) of Kafsokalivia († 1991) and Venerable Meletios of Ypseni († 19th century); the Russian Orthodox Church recognized the primacy of Constantinople in a special document having a Synodal status.
2014 The Gifts of the Wise Men to the Infant Jesus were brought to Moscow's Christ the Savior Cathedral by Archimandrite Parthenios, Igumen of the Monastery of Agios Pavlos on Mount Athos, together with the monks of the monastery, who handed the special ciborium to Patriarch Kirill I of Moscow, who placed it the center of the Cathedral; Sacred Synaxis of the Primates of the Orthodox Churches at the Phanar from 6–9 March, in order to deliberate on matters pertaining to the entire Orthodox Church throughout the world and procedural issues for the convocation of the Holy and Great Council; Abp. Ieronymos declared his support for the Robben Island Declaration for the Freedom of Marwan Barghouhti and all Palestinian Prisoners; Metropolitans Seraphim of Piraeus and Andrew of Dryinoupolis of the Church of Greece, write a lengthy epistle sent to Pope Francis on 10 April 2014, concerning his past, the abysmal State of Papism, and a plea to return to Holy Orthodoxy; death of renowned lay theologian, philologist and charismatic preacher Nikolaos Sotiropoulos, a fiery Orthodox traditionalist who was excommunicated by the Holy Synod of Constantinople in July 1993; death of Archimandrite Nikodemos Bilalis of New Skete (Mount Athos), a scholar, philologist and prolific writer, and founder of the "Panhellenic Union of Friends of the Polyteknon" (mothers of many children); Metr. Gerasimos (Michaleas) of San Francisco officiated at the Thyranoixia (Opening of the Doors) service of the Holy Transfiguration Greek Orthodox Church in South Anchorage, Alaska, being the northernmost parish of the Greek Orthodox Archdiocese of America and the only Greek Orthodox Church in the State of Alaska; Greek Orthodox Church bans religious rites for those who choose cremation; His Beatitude John X, Patriarch of Antioch and All the East conducted his irenic first visit to the Church of Greece from 23 to 27 October at the invitation of His Beatitude Ieronymos II;<ref>Joint Statement by the Churches of Antioch and Greece on Patriarch John X's Visit. Yahoo! Groups – Orthodox News. November 1, 2014.</ref> in September, Greek lawmakers passed a bill toughening anti-racism laws and making Holocaust denial a criminal act; Metr. Amvrosios of Kalavryta and Aigialeia adamantly spoke out against the "anti-racist law" passed in Greece, stating that "a priest who will speak up against Jehovah’s Witnesses and other religions from the ambo, may be declared a racist and imprisoned," adding that "soon we will become aliens in our own home country...your children will surely be slaves of Muslims...Greece is disappearing, faith is disappearing";Bishop Amvrosios Against Jihadists. Greek Reporter: Greece. 29 Sep 2014. Retrieved: 10 November 2015 in November, a  'Synaxis of Greek Orthodox Clergy and Monastics' , including Protopresbyters Dr. George Metallinos and Dr. Theodoros Zisis, launched a petition to oppose the new "divided church" ecclesiology of Patriarch Bartolomew, being signed by some 2000 Orthodox Christians at the time of its initial publication, including six hierarchs of the Church of Greece, and many abbots, clergy, monastics, and laity;Archpriest Andrew Phillips. Greek Faithful Launch anti-Patriarch Bartholomew Petition. Orthodox England – Events. 29 November 2014. the head of the Vatican Pope Francis visited Istanbul on 29 and 30 November for the Ecumenical Joint-Prayer service with Ec. Patr. Bartholomew on the Feast of St. Andrew; Pope Francis bowed to receive a kiss and the blessing of Ec. Patr. Bartholomew during joint prayer service in the Patriarchal Cathedral of St George at the Phanar; in a Special Eurobarometer poll, Cyprus had the highest proportion of respondents in the EU (21%) who said that religion was the most important value for them personally, while Greece had the third-highest proportion of respondents (15%).

2015 On 13 January, the Sacred and Holy Synod of the Ecumenical Patriarchate formally glorified Elder Paisios of Mount Athos († 1994);Ecumenical Patriarchate Officially Entered Elder Paisios among the List of Saints. Ecumenical Patriarchate – Orthodox Metropolitanate of Hong Kong and South East Asia (OMHKSEA). 13 January 2015. Retrieved: 20 January 2015. Aristides Baltas, the Greek Minister of Culture, Education and Religious Affairs, stated at a meeting of Parliament that the new government would be launching the process of separation of church and state in the near future; for the first time in over a thousand years, the largest portion of the sacred relics of Saint Barbara were transferred to Athens from Venice, on loan for two weeks from 10 May to 24 May and hosted at the Shrine of Saint Barbara in the municipality of Agia Varvara, after a highly symbolic move by the Roman Catholic Church who decided to respond positively to the request of the Apostoliki Diakonia of the Church of Greece on its upcoming 80th anniversary;Philip Chrysopoulos. Greek Archbishop Worships Holy Relics, Criticizes SYRIZA Parliamentary Representative. Greek Reporter – Greece. 14 May 2015. Retrieved: 3 June 2015. at a meeting hosted by the Greek Orthodox Church's Refugee and Migrant Center (KSPM-ERP), and attended by the General Secretary of the Churches’ Commission for Migrants in Europe (CCME) and other officials, Abp. Ieronymos II of Athens stated that refugees arriving at European borders should be hosted not only by Greece but by all other EU countries as well, proportional to the population of each, noting that illegal immigrants suffer because of the Western World's actions; in response to the International Day of Yoga, which was established by the United Nations in 2014, the Holy Synod of the Church of Greece stated that yoga is incompatible with Christianity as it is a fundamental aspect of Hinduism and cannot be considered as just a "form of exercise", also stating that it respects the freedom of religious belief but has a responsibility to avoid developing a "climate of religious syncretism"; in a letter to Justice Minister Nikos Paraskevopoulos, Abp. Ieronymos II of Athens slammed cohabitation agreements which grant couples living together similar rights to those who are married, describing the pact as "a poor imitation" of marriage; a Muslim cleric from Ankara recited a passage from the Koran in the Hagia Sophia for the first time in 85 years; the Patriarchate of Antioch broke communion with the Patriarchate of Jerusalem over the non-resolution of the jurisdictional dispute over Qatar (Résolution no. 5-3/2015); Résolution no. 5-3/2015 (The formal resolution in Arabic, Greek and French). June 2015. Retrieved 23 July 2015. in 2015 WikiLeaks released "The Saudi Cables", including a cable from the Saudi embassy in Jordan stating that in 2011 Abp. Atallah Hanna contacted them with a request for money and they agreed to give him $200,000; new English edition of Protopresbyter George Metallinos' 1992 Greek publication  Unia: The Face and the Disguise;  Greek-Russian businessman and politician Ivan Savvidis offers to build a new mosque in Trabzon and hand it to the city's municipality in return for making the Hagia Sophia in Trabzon a church once again; Synaxis of Hierarchs of the Ecumenical Throne in Istanbul from 29 August to 2 September, including 140 bishops and archbishops from churches in Europe, the United States and Asia, celebrating the Indiction (Church's New Year) and exchanging ideas on a wide range of issues from a Pan-Orthodox Synod, to environmental issues, to interfaith dialogue and other social issues;Orthodox Church leaders mark church’s New Year in Istanbul. PRAVMIR.COM. 2 SEPTEMBER 2015. Retrieved: 3 September 2015. Abp. Ieronymos II of Athens and All Greece accused Europe and the Greek government of trying to alter Christian Greek society and the identity of Greek people; on a formal visit to Lambeth Palace from 2–4 November, Ec. Patr. Bartholomew and the Abp. of Canterbury Justin Welby marked the publication of a new agreed Common Statement,   'In the Image and Likeness of God: A Hope-Filled Anthropology'  , the culmination of six years of study on "what Anglicans and Orthodox can say together about the meaning of human personhood in the divine image"; the Prime Minister of Greece Alexis Tsipras visited the Patriarchate of Jerusalem, praising the contribution of the Patriarchate to interreligious dialogue and being awarded the Grand Cross of the Order of the Holy Sepulchre (Greek: Μεγαλόσταυρος του Τάγματος των Ιπποτών του Παναγίου Τάφου) by Patriarch Theophilos III;Ioanna Zikakou. Greek Prime Minister Tsipras Ends Official Visit to Israel, Palestinian Areas. Greek Reporter: Greece. 27 Nov 2015. Retrieved: 27 November 2015. the Greek parliament legislated a cohabitation agreement for same-sex couples, with a parliamentary majority of 193 MPs in favor, 56 MPs against and 51 absent; commenting on the recent Anti-Racism Law and on the recognition of same-sex unions in Greece, various Greek Orthodox Hierarchs warned that the time of persecutions has arrived in Orthodox Greece; the UNHCR reported that 851,319 refugees and migrants arrived in Greece in 2015 as a gateway to the Schengen Area; the Greek Orthodox Patriarchate of Jerusalem, with the agreement of two other major communities (Roman Catholic and Armenian Apostolic Churches), invited the National Technical University of Athens (which had previously led restoration projects on the Athenian Acropolis and the Hagia Sophia) to restore the Aedicule of the Church of the Holy Sepulchre in March 2016, with work to be completed by the spring of 2017.

2016 The Church of Jerusalem canonized Venerable John the Chosebite / John Jacob of Neamţ (†1960); Η Συνοδική Πράξη Αγιοκατατάξεως του Οσίου Ιωάννου του Χοζεβίτου. Romfea.gr. Κυριακή, 31 Ιανουάριος 2016.  Russian President Vladimir Putin visited Mount Athos alongside Patriarch Kirill, in order to mark the 1,000-year presence of Russian Orthodox monks in Greece; Patriarch Kirill consecrated the restored cathedral of the Old Russikon skete of the Great-Martyr Panteleimon, on Holy Mount Athos on 28 May; the Turkish government stated it would permit the use of the Hagia Sophia basilica for Islamic Ramadan prayers throughout the month, a move that Greek officials decried as "retrograde" and disrespectful; in a letter to the Greek Secretary-General for Transparency and Human Rights, over 50 organisations, including the National Secular Society (NSS), urged the Ministry of Justice to abolish Greek blasphemy laws and "drop all related charges pending" before Greek courts; Holy and Great Council of the Orthodox Church is held in Kolymvari, Crete, from 17–27 June, with 10 out of 14 autocephalous Churches in attendance, agreeing on six official documents; the XXIII Conference of the Inter-Parliamentary Assembly on Orthodoxy (I.A.O.) met in Thessaloniki; over 60 Athonite Fathers wrote an "open letter" to the Holy Community of Mt. Athos calling for an immediate convocation of the governing body of Athos to formally condemn the Council in Crete, stating their intention to cease commemorating the Patriarch of Constantinople due to his leadership in the "false council" at which the pan-heresy of ecumenism was supported; ecclesiastical delegation from Church of Greece met the Patriarch and Hierarchs of Church of Georgia from 25–28 July, to express – on behalf of all faithful Orthodox Christians in Greece – their heartfelt gratitude to the Patriarch, Hierarchy and Faithful of the Venerable and Martyric Church of Georgia for their confession of the Orthodox Faith over and against the rise – in council – of syncretistic ecumenism, and to discuss the proper response to the unorthodox "Council of Crete"; a public consultation process for Constitutional Revision was launched by Greek Prime Minister Alexis Tsipras, including a proposed a "neutrality of the State" but with preservation of the recognition of the Christian Orthodox faith as "prevailing religion, for historical and practical reasons";Irene Kostaki. New Greece 2021: Tsipras’s Constitutional revision with a Latin American twist. 22:15 JULY 25, 2016. New Europe. Retrieved: 8 August 2016. a group of protesters said to be anarchists burst into and disrupted the Divine Liturgy at the Greek Orthodox Church of Gregory Palamas in Thessaloniki; repose of Schema-Archimandrite Jeremiah (Alekhin), hegumen of the Russian Monastery of St Panteleimon on Mt Athos, aged 100, the oldest hegumen on the Holy Mountain; amid growing tension between the Church of Greece and the government over changes to the way religion is taught at schools, Abp. Ieronymos stated that "Greece and Orthodoxy are not for sale"; in a lengthy presentation to the hierarchy of the Church of Greece, Abp. Ieronymos dismissed calls for the separation of church and state as outdated remnants of the previous century, targeting left-wing ideology that is shrouded in a progressive guise as the driving force behind the move for the separation, while noting that the people will decide whether such a separation can take place;Archbishop: separating Church from State will come up against society. Ekathimerini.com. 04.10.2016. Retrieved: 5 October 2016. Αρχιεπίσκοπος: Η Εκκλησία δε θα ζητήσει ποτέ τον χωρισμό από το λαό Της – (ΕΙΣΗΓΗΣΗ). Romfea.gr. 04 Οκτώβριος 2016. Retrieved: 5 October 2016. Archimandite Athanasios Athanasios, Proigoumenos of the Holy Monastery of the Great Meteora wrote " The 'Council' of Crete, The Chronicle of a Premeditated Deviation ", a historical account and spiritual analysis demonstrating that the results of the 'Council' of Crete were pre-determined and pre-fabricated; according to a Pro rata survey for the Efimerida ton Syntakton newspaper, 46 of respondents were against severing state-church ties, while 38 percent were in favor of maintaining the existing status between the two institutions; Patr. Bartholomew I of Constantinople writes letter to Abp. Ieronymos II of Athens, demanding the defrocking and severing of communion with those opposed to the Pan-Orthodox Council in Crete; in his Patriarchal Proclamation of Christmas 2016, Ec. Patr. Bartholomew declared 2017 as the Year of Protection of the Sacredness of Childhood, inviting everyone to recognize and respect the rights and integrity of children; official figures provided by the Church of Greece show a total of 9,792 parish and monastery churches.
2017 First Russian church is opened in Cyprus, in the village of Episkopeio (Archdiocese of Tamassos and Oreini), dedicated to St Andrew the First-Called and All the Saints Who Shone Forth in the Russian Land;METROPOLITAN HILARION OF VOLOKOLAMSK BEGINS HIS WORKING VISIT TO CYPRUS. The Russian Orthodox Church – Department for External Church Relations. 26.03.2017 21:50. St. Anthony's Greek Orthodox Monastery in Arizona published The Departure of the Soul According to the Teaching of the Orthodox Church, the first comprehensive presentation of the teachings of over 120 Orthodox Saints and dozens of holy hierarchs, clergy, and theologians on the subject of the soul's exodus to the next life; the Greek State recognized Paganism (Hellenic Religion) as a religion, through a decision of the Greek Ministry of Education, Research and Religious Affairs, defined as a 'Known Religion' according to paragraph 17 – the only form of recognition for a religion in Greece; Metr. Seraphim of Piraeus wrote a 37-page letter to Turkish President Recep Tayyip Erdoğan urging him to convert to Greek Orthodox Christianity and be baptised in the Ecumenical Patriarchate of Constantinople, also suggesting that Russian President Vladimir Putin be his godfather. the Patriarchs and Heads of the Christian Churches in Jerusalem criticized what they see as a breach of the status quo in the capital, claiming there is a "systematic attempt to undermine the integrity of the Holy City of Jerusalem and the Holy Land, and to weaken the Christian presence"; Patr. Theophilos III of Jerusalem visited Pope Francis of Rome at the Vatican, raising two recent issues of all the Christian Churches of the Holy Land, namely: the proposed bill by 40 Members of the Knesset which, if passed into law, would deny the rights of the Churches to freely deal with their land properties, as well as the recent decision of the Israeli District Court in Jerusalem, which gave effect to the unauthorised and illegitimate contracts relating to the Jaffa Gate properties that belong to the Patriarchate of Jerusalem; the Greek parliament passed a law on Tuesday 10 October to make it easier for anyone 15 years of age and older to change their legally recognized gender, a move that was denounced by Church of Greece as a threat to the social fabric; a particle of the relics of St. Seraphim of Sarov is brought from Diveyevo Monastery to the Greek town of Patras from 16–26 November, timed to the inter-Orthodox conference The Voice of Apostle Andrew the First-Called in Modern World held on 17–18 November; the Greek Orthodox Metropolis of Sweden and all Scandinavia established a new parish in the Norwegian city of Bergen, named after St. Chrysostomos of Smyrna, martyred in 1922; with the approval and recommendation of the Church of Greece, on 27 November the Sacred and Holy Synod of the Ecumenical Patriarchate formally glorified Archimandrite Elder Iakovos (Tsalikis) (†1991), Igumen of the Monastery of Saint David the Elder in Euboea. Ι.Μ. Χαλκίδος (Metropolis of Chalcis, Istiaia and Sporades Islands). Πρώτη Δοξολογία για την αγιοκατάταξη του Οσίου Ιακώβου στην Ι.Μ. Οσίου Δαυίδ. ROMFEA.GR. 29 Νοεμβρίου 2017. 

 2018 The historic Monastery of St. John the Baptist in the Bethabara area, east of Jericho, on the west bank of the river Jordan, is reopened as an Orthodox Shrine of the Jerusalem Patriarchate on Monday 29 January; death of French Archimandrite Placide Deseille (fr), a well-known Orthodox patrologist and theologian and the founder and hegumen of two Athonite monasteries in France that are metochia of Simonopetra on Mt. Athos; first Orthodox monastery is opened in South Africa, the Monastery of Sts. Nicholas the Wonderworker, Nektarios of Aegina, and Paisios the Athonite, near Hartbeespoort, 40 miles north of Johannesburg; on 17 February, hundreds of Christians rallied peacefully in support of the Greek Orthodox Patriarchate of Jerusalem and the other Jerusalem Churches against tax measures (Arnona) imposed by the Israeli Jerusalem Municipality on the Holy Churches and their adjacent buildings;New municipal tax measures ‘threaten churches’ ministry in Jerusalem,’ leaders say. Anglican Journal. 15 February 2018. Retrieved: 20 February 2018.  on 25 February, the Heads of Churches in charge of the Holy Sepulchre and the Status Quo governing the various Christian Holy Sites in Jerusalem – namely the Greek Orthodox Patriarchate, the Custody of the Holy Land and the Armenian Patriarchate – took the unprecedented step of the closure of the Church of the Holy Sepulchre as a measure of protest against the Jerusalem Municipality’s "discriminatory and racist" pursuing of 650 million shekels (over $186 million) in church taxes, against centuries of precedent,Griffin Paul Jackson. Jerusalem Christians Unite ... to Close Church of the Holy Sepulchre. Christianity Today (CT). 25 February 2018 10:40 PM. Retrieved: 27 February 2018.Gregory Pappas. Angry Jerusalem Patriarch Closes Holy Sepulchre Church Amid Israeli "Discriminatory and Racist" Moves Against Christians. Pappas Post. 25 February 2018. Retrieved: 27 February 2018. slammed also by Palestine, Jordan and Lebanon, as Israeli tax and land grab plans targeting churches in Jerusalem in violation of international regulations; the Ecumenical Patriarchate declared that the actions of the Bulgarian Orthodox Church regarding the schismatic and unrecognized Macedonian Orthodox Church to be un-canonical, also seriously criticized by the Serbian Orthodox Church and Church of Greece; the Office of Heresies and Para-Religions of the Metropolis of Piraeus issued a letter admonishing ecumenical circles for an orchestrated plot and persecution against Elder Ephraim of Arizona and monastic elders who are battling ecumenism; Σκληρή επίθεση της Μητρόπολης Πειραιώς στο Φανάρι για τον γέροντα Εφραίμ της Αριζόνας. ΒΗΜΑ ΟΡΘΟΔΟΞΙΑΣ. 17-02-2018 | 22:00:58. Retrieved: 22 February 2018. the glorification of Elder Iakovos (Tsalikis) of Euboea was liturgically celebrated on Sunday 3 June 2018, at St. David Monastery, headed by His All-Holiness Ecumenical Patriarch Bartholomew, with the concelebration of 30 Orthodox bishops from the Greek and Cypriot Churches and the Ecumenical Patriarchate; African King Tchiffi Zie Jean Gervais of Côte d'Ivoire, Permanent Secretary General of the 'Forum of Kings, Princes, Sheiks and Traditional Leaders of Africa', is received into the Orthodox Church on Mt. Athos, baptized by Hieromonk Dionysius of Koutloumousiou Monastery with the Christian name of David;Secretary General Of Africa's Forum Of Kings Visits Luxembourg. AFRIKA 247. 17 December 2017. the Holy Synod of the Church of Greece declared St. Therapont of Cyprus (May 14) and St. Gregory the Theologian (Jan. 25) as patron saints in the medical field. members of the Ukrainian Orthodox Church's Synod met with Patriarch Bartholomew of Constantinople, concerning ‘the impossibility of legalizing the schism’ in Ukraine and also to the need to heal it; 25th annual Interparliamentary Assembly on Orthodoxy (IAO) took place at the Byzantine & Christian Museum in Athens; 500th anniversary since St. Maxim the Greek of Vatopedi Monastery arrived in Russia marked on Mount Athos; glorification of Elder Amphilochios (Makris) of Patmos (†1970); Synaxis of the Hierarchy of the Ecumenical Throne meets in Constantinople, 1–3 September; Abp. Ieronymos II told a meeting of the Holy Synod in Athens that he feared the Greek state was rudderless after nearly a decade of wrenching economic crisis, a rising crime rate, crippled health and justice systems, inadequate welfare and what he called a lack of direction in foreign policy, and that the Orthodox church and its teachings are in danger of being forgotten in an increasingly secularized and crisis-ridden society; the Synod of Bishops of the Russian Orthodox Church, at its session on 15 October 2018, in Minsk, severed Eucharistic communion with the Ecumenical Patriarchate of Constantinople, following the decisions of the Patriarchate of Constantinople 'to grant autocephaly to the Ukrainian Church'; Greece ranked first in Europe in a list by Jo Di Graphics measuring the number of priests per 100,000 people, with about 88 priests per 100,000 people in Greece, followed by Italy in second with 82.8, and Romania in third with 80.1;Number of priests per 100,000 people. Jo Di Graphics. 31 October 2018. Retrieved: 6 November 2018. Greek Prime Minister Alex Tsipras announced plans to disestablish the Church of Greece, intending to amend the Constitution of Greece to remove references to the church and define the Greek state as 'religiously neutral',Greece takes major step towards disestablishment of Orthodox Church. National Secular Society (NSS). 9 November 2018. opposed by many hierarchs, clergy, and faithful of the Greek Orthodox Church. on 27 November 2018 the Synod of the Ecumenical Patriarchate decided to dissolve the Patriarchal Exarchate for Orthodox Parishes of the Russian Tradition in Western Europe, by repealing the Patriarchal Tomos of 1999, without consulting the ruling hierarch Archbishop John (Renneteau) of Chariopoulis.
 2019 Metr. Tikhon of the Orthodox Church in America (O.C.A) joined Ecumenical Patriarch Bartholomew on his annual pilgrimage to Cappadocia, concelebrating the Divine Liturgy on the Sunday of All Saints; the holy synod of the Church of Greece establishes "Unborn Child" Day via circular number 5721/2018, to be celebrated on the Sunday after the feast of the Nativity, to protect children and to help solve the country’s demographic problem; death of Elder Ephraim of Philotheou and Arizona;Elder Ephraim of Arizona has Reposed. MYSTAGOGY. 8 December 2019. Greek Orthodox Byzantine chant is added to Unesco's Representative List of Intangible Cultural Heritage of Humanity.Byzantine chant – Cyprus and Greece. United Nations Educational, Scientific and Cultural Organization – Intangible Cultural Heritage. Retrieved: 14 December 2019. 
 2020 The Holy Synod of the Church of Greece expressed the Church’s position on voluntary abortion as constituting murder; taking into account the suggestions of the Synodal Committee on Heresies, the Holy Synod of the Church of Greece issued a statement condemning Yoga as "a fundamental chapter of the religion of Hinduism" that is "absolutely incompatible with the Orthodox Christian faith and has no place in the lives of Christians", and also urging all bishops and clergy to refrain from any event organized by the Rotary and the Lions organizations, whose activities are not limited to social events, but also extend to religious acts.

See also

Eastern Orthodoxy in Greece
List of archbishops of Athens
Greek Orthodox Church
Eastern Orthodox Church organization
History
History of the Eastern Orthodox Church
History of Eastern Christianity
History of the Eastern Orthodox Church under the Ottoman Empire
History of Eastern Orthodox Churches in the 20th century
Timeline of Eastern Orthodoxy in America
Church Fathers
Apostolic Fathers
Church FathersAnte-Nicene Fathers (book)Desert FathersNicene and Post-Nicene FathersList of Church Fathers

Notes

References

Bibliography
 Giannēs Koliopoulos and Thanos Veremēs. Greece: The Modern Sequel, from 1831 to the Present. NYU Press, 2002. 407 pp. 
 Anastasios Anastassiadis. Religion and Politics in Greece: The Greek Church's 'Conservative Modernization' in the 1990s. Research in Question, No.11, January 2004. (PDF).
 C.M. Woodhouse. Modern Greece. 4th ed. Boston : Faber and Faber, 1986.
 Charalambos K. Papastathis and Nikos Maghioros. "Greece: A Faithful Orthodox Christian State. THE ORTHODOX CHURCH IN THE HELLENIC REPUBLIC". In: Javier Martínez-Torrón and W. Cole Durham, Jr.. Religion and the Secular State: National Reports (Issued for the occasion of the XVIIIth International Congress of Comparative Law, Washington, D.C., July 2010). Published by: Complutense Universidad de Madrid, in cooperation with The International Center for Law and Religion Studies, Brigham Young University. July 2014. pp. 339–375.
 Demetrios J. Constantelos. Understanding the Greek Orthodox Church: Its Faith, History and Life. 4th Edition. Brookline, Mass.: Hellenic College Press, 2005. 
 Dimitri E. Conomos, Graham Speake. Mount Athos, the Sacred Bridge: The Spirituality of the Holy Mountain. Oxford: Peter Lang, 2005.
 Dr. Daphne Halikiopoulou. Patterns of Secularization: Church, State and Nation in Greece and the Republic of Ireland. Ashgate Publishing, Ltd., 2011. 
 Effie Fokas. Religion in the Greek Public Sphere: Nuancing the Account. Journal of Modern Greek Studies. Volume 27, Number 2, October 2009, pp. 349–374.
 Efthymios Nicolaidis. Science and Eastern Orthodoxy: From the Greek Fathers to the Age of Globalization. Transl. Susan Emanuel. Johns Hopkins University Press. 2011. 288 pp.  
 Herman A. Middleton. Precious Vessels of the Holy Spirit: The Lives & Counsels of Contemporary Elders of Greece. 2nd Ed. Protecting Veil Press, 2004.
 John Hadjinicolaou (Ed.). Synaxis: An Anthology of the Most Significant Orthodox Theology in Greece Appearing in the Journal Synaxē from 1982 to 2002. Montréal : Alexander Press, 2006.
 John L. Tomkinson. Between Heaven and Earth: The Greek Church. Anagnosis Books, Athens, 2004.
 Mother Nectaria McLees. EVLOGEITE! A Pilgrim's Guide to Greece. 1st Ed. St. Nicholas Press, Kansas City, MO, 2002. 927 pp.
 Norman Russell. Modern Greek Theologians and the Greek Fathers. Philosophy & Theology Volume 18, Issue 1. 2007.10.17. Pages 77–92.
 Rev. Dr. Nicon D. Patrinacos (M.A., D.Phil. (Oxon)). A Dictionary of Greek Orthodoxy – Λεξικον Ελληνικης Ορθοδοξιας. Light & Life Publishing, Minnesota, 1984.
 Rev. A. H. Hore. Eighteen centuries of the Orthodox Greek Church. London: James Parker & Co. 1899. 706pp. (Re-printed: Gorgias Press LLC, 2003.)
 Vasilios Makrides (Professor). Hellenic Temples and Christian Churches: A Concise History of the Religious Cultures of Greece from Antiquity to the Present. New York University Press, 2009. 345 pp. 
 Victor Roudometof and Vasilios Makrides (Eds.). Orthodox Christianity in 21st Century Greece: The Role of Religion in Culture, Ethnicity, and Politics.'' Ashgate Publishing, Ltd., 2010. 258 pp. 

21st century in Greece
Cultural history of Greece
Greek Orthodoxy in Greece
Orthodoxy in Greece
History of Eastern Orthodoxy in Greece
History of Greece since 1974
Orthodox Church